DM2A4 Seehecht (export designation "SeaHake mod 4" ) is the latest heavyweight torpedo developed by Atlas Elektronik for the German Navy, as a further update of DM2 (Deutsches Modell 2) torpedo which was released in 1976.

Description 
Being the successor of the DM2A3, it features an advanced electrical propulsion system and a fiber optic cable for torpedo guidance and communication, which, in conjunction with advanced signals processing and mission logic, makes the torpedo largely countermeasure resistant. The DM2A4/SeaHake mod 4 is the first torpedo ever to be guided by a fiber optic wire. With a fully digital system architecture, increased range and speed and its new conformal array sonar with a very wide panoramic sensor angle as well as the additional wake homing sensor, the DM2A4/SeaHake mod 4 provides greatly advanced performance over its predecessor. The homing head shell is a hydrodynamic optimised parabolic shape which aims to reduce torpedo self-noise and cavitation to an absolute minimum.  The homing head's conformal transducer array permits detection angles of +/-100° in the horizontal and +/-24° in the vertical, therefore supporting larger acquisition angles in comparison to traditional flat arrays.  The wide angle array is designed to reduce maneuvering when in search and reconnaissance stages, therefore also reducing self-noise and preserving battery power.

The weapon has a modular design that includes up to four silver zinc battery modules and is able to achieve a range of more than 50 km (27 nmi) and a speed exceeding 92.6 km/h (50 kn) powered by a high frequency permanent magnet motor, with a closed-loop cooling system independent from the environment. Exact performance data are classified. The torpedo design template may also be used as the basis for ROV. The weapon is armed with a 260 kg PBX, (RDX–aluminium) warhead (equivalent to 460 kg of TNT) with magnetic influence and contact fuzes. The charge and fuse are insensitive and electromagnetic pulse safe.

The weapon has a length of 6.6 m when configured with 4 battery modules, and is respectively shorter when configured with either 3 or 2 battery modules depending upon the requirement of the operating unit. Diameter of the unit is 533 mm.

Service history 
The torpedo is in service with the German Navy Type 212 submarines, has been delivered to the Pakistan Navy for service in the Agosta 90B submarines, has been selected by the Spanish Navy for its new S80A submarines and has been sold to other operators worldwide.

In May 2018, Hellenic Navy released a Request For Information letter (RFI), asking various companies for acquiring 533mm heavy torpedoes for its four Type 214 Papanikolis submarines plus one updated Type 209 AIP Okeanos. In October 2020, DM2A4 was chosen as the preferred solution, with a program consisting of 36 DM2A4, plus refurbish of number of older SUT Mod0 to Mod4 standard, plus extra batteries for older SST torpedoes / SUT Mod0 torpedoes, with a total cost of 105m euro. In September 2021, the contract was modified, with a program consisting of 44 DM2A4, without refurbishment of a number of older SUT Mod0 to Mod4 standard, plus extra batteries for older SST torpedoes / SUT Mod0 torpedoes, with a total cost of 110m euro.

Operators
The SeaHake Mod 4 torpedo is in service with eighteen countries and over 300 torpedoes (as of 2015) have been delivered:

 (on Khalid-class submarines)

See also
 Roketsan Akya Turkish torpedo
Mk 48
Varunastra (torpedo)
Black Shark
Spearfish
Tigerfish
Baek Sang Eo (White Shark)
Type 89
Type 65
Yu-6

References

External links
Manufacturer's homepage

Torpedoes of Germany
Post–Cold War weapons of Germany
Military equipment introduced in the 2000s